Arinc may refer to:
Arınc, Azerbaijan
ARINC, an American communications company